The 1969 Oakland Raiders season was the team's tenth as a franchise, and tenth in both Oakland and the American Football League. The campaign saw the team attempt to improve upon its 12–2 record from 1968.

The Raiders stormed to a 12–1–1 record in 1969 and led the league in wins for a third consecutive season. In doing so, they posted a staggering  record over their final three years of AFL regular season play. The season ended with an upset loss at home in the AFL Championship Game to division rival Kansas City, the eventual Super Bowl champion.

Additionally, the season marked the debut of Hall of Fame head coach John Madden, previously the linebacker coach,  promoted after the January departure of John Rauch for Buffalo. Madden led the Raiders to seven division titles, seven AFL/AFC Championship Games, and a Super Bowl championship before leaving after 1978, his tenth as head coach, with a  regular season record.

Roster

Regular season

Schedule

Saturday night (September 20, October 4), Saturday (December 13)

Standings

Game summaries

Week 1

Week 6

    
    
    
    
    
    
    
    
    
    
    
    

Daryle Lamonica 21/36, 313 Yds, 6 TD

Week 14

Postseason

AFL championship game

Kansas City Chiefs 17, Oakland Raiders 7
January 4, 1970, at Oakland–Alameda County Coliseum, Oakland, California

Scoring Summary
OAK – Smith 3 run (Blanda kick)
KC – Hayes 1 run (Stenerud kick)
KC – Holmes 5 run (Stenerud kick)
KC – Field goal Stenerud 22

Awards and honors
 Daryle Lamonica, Co-AFL MVP

References

Oakland
Oakland Raiders seasons
Oakland